The MRT Putrajaya Line, also known as MRT 2/MRT SSP, is the second Mass Rapid Transit (MRT) line in Klang Valley, Malaysia, and the third fully automated and driverless rail system in the country. It was previously known as the Sungai Buloh–Serdang–Putrajaya Line (SSP) Line.

While the Phase 2 which covers the remaining of the line including the underground stretch was opened on 16 March 2023.

The line is numbered 12 and coloured yellow on official transit maps.

The line was developed and is owned by MRT Corp but operated as part of the Rapid KL network by Rapid Rail. It also forms part of the Klang Valley Integrated Transit System. 

The newly built length of the line 52.2 km in length but includes 5.5 km of the MRT Kajang Line which was transferred to the MRT Putrajaya Line. The line includes a 13.5 km underground section. A total of 37 stations, 11 of them underground, were built.

Route
The MRT starts in   Kwasa Damansara where it annexed the section from here to   Sungai Buloh from the MRT Kajang Line. From Sungai Buloh, the line runs parallel with the KTM Komuter line to   Kepong Sentral/Sri Damansara Timur. However, there are a few stations the MRT line between the two which is not served by the KTM.

The MRT then continues towards the towns of Kepong and Jinjang. As of the first phase, the Putrajaya line ends at   Kampung Batu. At  Jalan Ipoh, the line starts going underground while Jalan Ipoh itself being the only station on the network to be half-sunken/sub-surface. The line carries under the Ipoh Road to     Titiwangsa which will interchange with the LRT Ampang/Sri Petaling and KL Monorail lines. The line then runs under the  Hospital Kuala Lumpur and meets the LRT Kelana Jaya line (also underground) at   Ampang Park.  Persiaran KLCC serves as a second station in the KLCC subdistrict, itself also served by the LRT Kelana Jaya Line. The line continues to   Tun Razak Exchange, interchanging with the Kajang line. The Putrajaya Line reunites with the Ampang/Sri Petaling line at    Chan Sow Lin.

After thru provisional Bandar Malaysia North and South stations, the MRT Putrajaya line resurfaces at  Kuchai. Once again, the line meets with the LRT Sri Petaling line at   Sungai Besi, then continuing to serve Serdang. Following this, the line briefly parallels KTM and KLIA Transit (airport express) until  Serdang Raya Selatan, and veers off to Universiti Putra Malaysia and the Seri Kembangan subdistrict. The MRT line then enters Sepang constituency, having 3 stops including two in Cyberjaya, before ending at   Putrajaya Sentral, where it interchanges with KLIA Transit. The station may be integrated with the proposed Putrajaya Monorail in the future. Putrajaya Sentral will also be the southernmost station under the Rapid KL rail network.

Chronology

13 October 2014 – The 2nd MRT line is now planned to be from Sungai Buloh, Selayang to Pandan; instead of from Kuala Lumpur to Port Klang.
3 December 2014 – During a briefing of the 1st MRT line, the MRT CEO revealed more details about the 2nd line. He had said that the line will be 59.5 km long with 49.3 km will be elevated and 10.2 km will be underground. There will be 40 stations where 31 will be elevated and 9 will be underground. Construction is expected to begin by November 2015 will approval and public discussion starts in early 2015.
12 February 2015 – MRT Corp prepares tender for MRT2, project display in Q2.
16 March 2015 – MRT2 from Sungai Buloh to Putrajaya has been approved by the Federal government. The project was allocated RM23 billion in the Budget 2015.
2 April 2015 – New alignment for MRT2 proposed. The alignment south of Tun Razak Exchange was then altered drastically to provide connectivity with the proposed High Speed Rail project. With this revision, the line stands at 52.2 km long with a total of 36 stations. Of these, 11 are underground while 25 are elevated.
22 April 2015 – Department of Environment (DOE)'s Detailed Environment Impact Assessment (DEIA) for the MRT2 is available for download from their website.
14 May 2015 – Details of MRT2 project on public display start on 15 May 2015. The public can visit the SPAD office, MRT Corp offices, Kuala Lumpur City Hall, Selayang Municipal Council and Petaling Jaya City Council, with roadshows, primarily at shopping malls near the MRT2 alignment.
12 August 2016 – On the MRT2 project, the groundbreaking ceremony was expected to be held at end of the month of August 2016 or early September 2016.
15 September 2016 – Construction on the MRT line launched with a groundbreaking ceremony at the site of the future Putrajaya Sentral MRT station by former Prime Minister Dato' Seri Najib Tun Razak.
31 March 2017 – The line is 5.3% completed.
24 May 2017 – 7.5% of the line was completed. For the elevated section, progress of the first and second packages are at 20.9% and 10.3% respectively with increased works being seen from Jalan Kuala Selangor to Jalan Kepong. Whereas for underground works, the work progress was at 8.7%.
June 2017 – The line is 10.25% completed, based on the video released by MRT Corp on 18 December 2017.
5 September 2017 – The line has reached the completion of 12.05% and expected to reach 19% by the end of 2017. The underground works will commence by the first quarter of 2018 with the arrival of 2 Tunnel Boring Machine (TBMs) within 2–3 weeks and another 2 of them by early next year.
26 September 2017 – The project director Datuk Amiruddin Ma’aris mentioned the line is currently achieved completion of 13.70%.
28 September 2017 – According to the MRT Corp director of underground works for the MRT line, Blaise Mark Pearce, 23% of the underground works for the MRT line were expected to be completed by the end of 2017.
10 October 2017 – An explosion has occurred at the Mass Rapid Transit (MRT) station construction site in Bandar Malaysia. According to the police, it was believed that the explosion happened because of an old unexploded bomb from the Second World War through the initial investigation. Three Bangladesh workers were seriously injured and two of them lost their legs while another suffered injuries on the hands and legs.
13 October 2017 – Mass Rapid Transit Corporation Sdn Bhd (MRT Corp) has won the prestigious “Be Inspired Awards 2017” for its use of Building Information Modelling (BIM) in the construction of the MRT line.
13 November 2017 – The first Tunnel Boring Machine arrived in Port Klang and delivered to site. The rest are expected to arrive in coming weeks.
18 December 2017 – MRT Corp released a video describing the progress of the MRT line from 2016 to 2017 in YouTube. The progress is described in packages. The progress statistics are: 23.68%, 15.43%, 9.05%, 10.32%, 35.31% and 11.51% respectively for packages V201, V202, V203, V210, Serdang Depot and underground.
1 January 2018 – Malaysia's 1st shopping mall, Ampang Park, is officially ceased its operation in order to make way to the construction of the Ampang Park station under such line.
18 February 2018 – The line has achieved 21% completion. The final Tunnel Boring Machine for the MRT line is expected to be launched by mid-2019.
1 March 2018 – Underground works commenced with the first Tunnel Boring Machine. The launching is done at the shaft located at the Bandar Malaysia North MRT station. The line has achieved 22% completion according to the CEO of the MRT Corp, Datuk Seri Shahril Mokhtar.
3 March 2018 – A construction worker died while two others survived when a launching gantry at an MRT construction site in Jalan Jinjang (Work Package V203), collapsed at around 11:40pm.
23 April 2018 – The Director of Strategic Communications and Stakeholder Relations from MRT Corp, Dato' Najmuddin Abdullah, says the line is now completed at the progress of more than 24%.
June 2018 – The line is 30% completed, based on the video released by MRT Corp on 9 December 2018.
11 July 2018 – The line was close to 30% complete as at early July, according to the project director Datuk Amiruddin Ma’aris.
8 October 2018 – The Finance Minister, Lim Guan Eng announced the decision to change the project structure as well as terminate the contract from MMC-Gamuda and re-tender the unfinished underground portion of the project by an open tender process, due to the fact the Federal Government and MMC-Gamuda have failed to reach an agreement relating to the underground portion of the construction project. This decision had caused a lot of protests from MMC-Gamuda and workers due to the fact that some 20,000 workers tend to lose their job.
9 October 2018 – The shares of MMC and Gamuda fell due to the government's decision to terminate the underground section project.
10 October 2018 – The Prime Minister, Tun Dr. Mahathir Mohamad told the press that the decision to cancel the contract from MMC-Gamuda for the underground portion will be reconsidered.
11 October 2018 – The Economic Affairs' Minister, Dato' Seri Azmin Ali confirmed that the Cabinet has set up a committee to review the underground contract that was awarded to MMC-Gamuda for the project. According to the source, the four members of the committee are Minister of Finance Lim Guan Eng, Minister of Works Baru Bian, Transport Minister Anthony Loke and Economic Affairs Minister Azmin Ali.
17 October 2018 – The Finance Minister, Lim Guan Eng said the decision to terminate the contract was Cabinet's decision.
26 October 2018 – Due to budget concerns, and a re-tender, construction costs proposed by MMC-Gamuda is about half what it was previously. The two Bandar Malaysia Stations have also been cancelled. The cost for construction of the underground portion is now RM13.11 billion. This brought to the entire cost for this project to be RM30.53 billion from the RM39.35 billion previously. This means MMC-Gamuda now secured the contract of the underground section and allowed to continue the construction.
13 November 2018 – Three MRT stations from the MRT Kajang Line (Sungai Buloh, Kampung Selamat and Kwasa Damansara) closed for two days to accommodate the first migration system works of the line.
9 December 2018 – MRT Corp released another video describing the progress of the MRT line from 2017 to 2018 in YouTube. The progress is described in packages. The progress for all packages have been mentioned. Package V201 achieved the highest progress with 45.7% whilst package V206 achieve the lowest progress with 13.1%. Underground section had the progress with 33.3%.
24 January 2019 – The first batch of carriages for the two sets of trains have arrived at Westport, Port Klang.
29 January 2019 – First TBM breakthrough happened at Chan Sow Lin station. The TBM was bored between Bandar Malaysia North and Chan Sow Lin. MRT Corp Sdn Bhd strategic communications and stakeholder relations director,  Datuk Najmuddin Abdullah said the overall construction was on track with a 41% completion rate as of December 2018.
9 March 2019 – Three MRT stations from the MRT Kajang Line (Sungai Buloh, Kampung Selamat and Kwasa Damansara) closed again for two days to accommodate the second migration system works of the line.
15 March 2019 – Second TBM breakthrough at Chan Sow Lin station based on the Instagram source from Datuk Najmuddin Abdullah.
15 March 2019 – Ninth and final TBM breakthrough of the year at Ampang Park station.
17 January 2020 – MRT is 70% completed with expected completion date for Phase 2 delayed to January 2023.
31 October 2020 – MRT Putrajaya Line construction is 82.51% completed. Phase One from the Kwasa Damansara to the Kampung Batu will begin operations in July 2021, while the rest of the line from the Kampung Batu Station to the Putrajaya Sentral will be operational under Phase Two in January 2023.
3 April 2021 – The Construction progress of Phase One section of the MRT Putrajaya Line (Kwasa Damansara – Kampung Batu) is at 97% and will begin operations in August 2021.
7 July 2021 - MRT Corp decided to postpone the opening of phase 1 from August to mid-November 2021 due to the COVID-19 movement control order in Malaysia.
16 November 2021 - MRT Corp announced that Phase 1 opening will be delayed again to the second quarter of 2022 as further tests are required. No exact date was provided.
2 December 2021 - MMC-Gamuda won Major Project of the Year award from International Tunnelling and Underground Space Association (ITA) for projects above 500 million euros. They managed to beat out the Ismailia Tunnels project under the Suez Canal, Egypt and Shantou Bay Tunnel project from China.
6 December 2021 - MMC Gamuda also bagged the International Project of the Year at the Ground Engineering Awards 2021 in London.
20 March 2022 - MRT Corp is currently looking at June 2022 as the possible opening date of Phase 1 operations. It has also said that the opening date depends on the results from the test runs.
21 May 2022 - MRT Corp confirms that Phase 1 operation will start at 3pm on June 16, 2022.
16 June 2022 - Launch of the MRT Putrajaya Line Phase 1 operations by Prime Minister Ismail Sabri Yaakob , along with 1 month of free rides for all public transportation services under RapidKL including the MRT.
23 December 2022 - The construction works of MRT Putrajaya Line Phase 2 were completed and the operational readiness phase is in progress. Because the tests may take longer period than usual to pass, the opening date of Phase 2 is expected on March 2023, delayed two months from the original January 2023 deadline.
3 March 2023 - MRT Corp confirms that the full Putrajaya line operation will start at 3pm on March 16, 2023.
16 March 2023 - Launch of the MRT Putrajaya Line Phase 2 operations by Prime Minister Anwar Ibrahim at the Serdang Depot. He mentioned that there will be free rides for the MRT Putrajaya Line effective from 16 March 2023 until 31 March 2023.

Station designs

Elevated station concepts 

	
The proposed design for the elevated stations is based on the “Serambi” concept. This concept is focused on the inspiring interaction and communication at a foyer or entrance space of a house such as the entrance space at a traditional rumah kampung or rumah panjang. The design opted is a simple and timeless design, which is derived from various design concepts, including that of the Japanese zen concept. Other aspects include open space, natural lighting and ventilation, and natural visual effects via play of lighting and shadows.
	
Compared to the Kajang Line's elevated station design, the columns have been pushed to the sides of the station, giving the stations an open and airy feel.

Underground station concepts 
	
Each of the underground stations will carry its own individual theme, similar to that of the Kajang Line stations. The proposed designs range from preserving the rustic, reflecting tidal rhythm, promoting well-being, vibrancy, pulse of life, discovering culture, molding forms, inspired by nature to streamlined flow.

List of stations 

28 (23 elevated + 1 half-sunken + 4 underground) out of 35 stations (excluding the ones on the MRT Kajang Line) are expected to have feeder bus services.

Kwasa Damansara station, along with the adjoining Sungai Buloh and Kampung Selamat stations were previously built as part of the MRT Kajang Line. These three stations are currently annexed by the Putrajaya Line, thus making Kwasa Damansara the interchange station between the two MRT lines.

Rolling stock 

The rolling stock will be provided by HAP Consortium which consists of Hyundai Rotem, Apex Communications and POSCO Engineering. The trains are assumed to be driverless with a capacity of 1,200 passengers in a 4-car trainsets formation.

The 4-car trainsets will be maintained at 2 purpose-built facilities, Sungai Buloh and Serdang depots, located nearby Kwasa Damansara and the proposed Taman Universiti stations respectively.

Formation
The train consists of four cars, with car 1 facing towards Kwasa Damansara and car 4 facing towards Putrajaya Sentral.

Ridership

Criticism 
Inaccessibility of stations and inadequate first and last mile connectivity has been criticized by potential users of the new MRT line - a problem which has already led to lower than expected ridership on other public transport lines in the Klang Valley. For example, the Cyberjaya stations were located further away from the main town centre.

References

Notes

External links 
 Mass Rapid Transit Corporation (MRT Corp)
 MRT Website
 Prasarana Malaysia Berhad (Prasarana)
 Suruhanjaya Pengangkutan Awam Darat (SPAD)

Proposed rail infrastructure in Malaysia
Klang Valley
Railway lines opened in 2022